Indian Creek is a stream in the U.S. state of Indiana. It is a tributary of the Tippecanoe River.

Indian Creek was so named on account of the area being a favorite camping ground of the Potawatomi Indians.

See also
List of rivers of Indiana

References

Rivers of Cass County, Indiana
Rivers of Pulaski County, Indiana
Rivers of White County, Indiana
Rivers of Indiana